Voivoida (Voïvóda), from the Slavic title voivode - may refer to:
Vasiliki, Lefkada, a village on the island of Lefkada
Vasiliki, Trikala, municipal unit in Thessaly

See also
Titani, Greece - formerly Voivonta (Greek: , Voïvontá), from the same Slavic title voivode